Execution Rocks Light is a lighthouse in the middle of Long Island Sound on the border between New Rochelle and Sands Point, New York. The granite tower is painted white with a brown band around the middle. It has an attached stone keeper's house which has not been inhabited since the light was automated in 1979.

History 
This island on which this lighthouse sits is claimed to derive its name from colonial New York, when slaveowning settlers of Sands Point murdered enslaved people by chaining them to the rocks during high tide to let them drown; this tale is first recorded by Robert Caro in 1974.<ref>Caro, Robert A. "The Power Broker" Random House 1974, p. 151</ref> A 1964 account in The Journal of Long Island History claims that in fact, murderers were manacled with chains to staples driven into the rock at low tide. A more likely etymology is that the British Admiralty named them Executioner's Rocks because so many ships ran aground on the treacherous rocks. References to "the Execution Rocks" in the Long Island Sound pre-date the American Revolution, existing as far back as 1766.

On March 3, 1847, the United States Congress appropriated $25,000 for creation of Execution Rocks Lighthouse. Designed by Alexander Parris, construction was completed in 1849, although it was not lit until 1850.  Over the years, it has survived both a fire and a shipwreck.

The island is under the authority of the United States Coast Guard and is off limits to the public. It can be seen, however, during the Long Island Lighthouse Society's Spring Cold Coast Cruise, and from the Throgs Neck Bridge.

A Daboll trumpet was added to Execution Rocks Light on Jan 25, 1869.

Before being executed for murder, serial killer Carl Panzram claimed in a posthumous autobiography that in the summer of 1920 that he raped and killed a total of ten sailors and dumped their bodies at sea near Execution Rocks Light.

On November 25, 1958, Execution Rocks Light was the location of a pivotal scene in the first season episode "The Bird Guard" of the television series Naked City.

On May 29, 2007, the Department of the Interior identified Execution Rocks Light Station as surplus under the National Historic Lighthouse Preservation Act of 2000.

It was added to the National Register of Historic Places in 2007 as Execution Rocks Light Station. On January 27, 2009, the Secretary of the Interior announced that Execution Rocks Light would be transferred to the Philadelphia-based Historically Significant Structures, which would partner with the Science Museum of Long Island to restore the light.

The lighthouse was featured on the Travel Channel show Ghost Adventures'' in 2009.

Chronology 

A chronological history of the lighthouse from the Coast Guard:

1847, March:  Congress appropriated $25,000 for the light to be built.
1849, May:  Construction was completed.
1850:  The lighthouse was first lit.
1856:  A fourth order Fresnel lens was installed.
1868:  The keeper's quarters were added. The keeper no longer had to live in the cramped space inside the tower.
December 8, 1918:  A fire with an unknown origin caused $13,500 in damages.  The engine house and machinery were destroyed, the tower and oil house were damaged and the windows, woodwork, gutters and eaves were also damaged.
December 5, 1979:  The lighthouse was automated. A VEGA lantern replaced the Fresnel lens.
2010: Historically Significant Structures Inc. is giving tower climb tours of the lighthouse in the summer.

References

External links 

 
 US-Lighthouses / Execution Rock Lighthouse History

Lighthouses completed in 1949
Lighthouses on the National Register of Historic Places in New York (state)
Long Island Sound
Buildings and structures in New Rochelle, New York
Reportedly haunted locations in New York (state)
National Register of Historic Places in Westchester County, New York
Transportation buildings and structures in Westchester County, New York